Finne Jager (born 6 December 1984), commonly known as Phynn, is a Dutch trance and techno DJ and producer. He is the founder of the American electronic dance music label Lunary Records.

Career

Early Stages
In 2000, Finne discovered his love for electronic dance music. Finding the style extremely interesting, he started exploring the possibilities of making electronic dance music. He first gained notoriety in an Ernesto vs. Bastian remix contest under the 'Mind Markers' guise. Out of hundreds of contestants, Finne was one of the three winners in the competition. He got in touch with Ernesto vs. Bastian and Sony's FTM label and did further remix work for the duo, remixing hits such as Stop 9.5 and Who's The Starter.

Phynn's 'Stop 9.5' remix was picked up by Tiësto, who played it on his second Tiesto In Concert edition, and featured it on the official DVD release.

In the second half of 2004, Finne (now commonly known as Phynn) decided to make a record with his friend Bart Van Wissen, known as Fictivision. The result was 'Escape' (released on DJ Tiësto's Black Hole Recordings), a track that introduced both Phynn and Fictivision onto the international trance map. Soon after that, Phynn followed up with an even bigger hit, this time a solo production, titled 'Lucid'. As of today it remains one of his biggest and most well known records. Lucid was heavily supported by Tiësto and was featured on the Tiesto in Concert DVD series as well.

Breakthrough
Finne was introduced to the 'big audience' as a closing act for Tiësto at the Heineken Music Hall in Amsterdam, on December 3, 2005, in front of an audience of over 5000 people. One month later, Phynn was declared 'Future Hero' by Mixmag, a well known electronic dance music magazine.

Following his global success, Black Hole Recordings asked Phynn to mix the 11th edition of the highly acclaimed In Trance We Trust series. Phynn accepted the offer and followed in the footsteps of legendary trance artists such as Johan Gielen, Cor Fijneman and Mark Norman and delivered the 11th edition of the series.

Trance Energy
In March 2007, Phynn reached a milestone in his career when he was asked to perform at the Main Stage of the world's biggest annual trance event Trance Energy, organized by Dutch event company ID&T. The audience size at Trance Energy 2007 counted over 25,000 people. At the age of 22, Phynn was the youngest DJ ever to perform at the Main Stage of Trance Energy. In 2008, Phynn performed at Trance Energy again at the 'Future Stage'.

'Metamorphosis' Album
Phynn released his debut artist album in November 2008 on Black Hole Recordings. Titled 'Metamorphosis', the album featured 12 original works, including tracks with vocalists Molly Bancroft and Tiff Lacey. Notable tracks from the album are 'Try Again feat, Tiff Lacey', 'Wait For A Moment feat. Molly Bancroft', 'C U Smile', 'Starfire At Night', 'Metamorphosis' and 'No More Mistakes feat Molly Bancroft'.

'Spacewalk' and 'Hello Love'
In 2009, Phynn released 'Spacewalk' on Black Hole Recordings. The song was an instant success, and top DJ's like Markus Schulz played the record for many months after its initial release, and it was placed on many compilations worldwide. Following up on 'Spacewalk', Phynn's next project was 'Hello Love' featuring Antonia from Jets Overhead. Just like 'Spacewalk', 'Hello Love' was a big hit with fans around the world, leading Ferry Corsten to include it on his Once Upon A Night mixed compilation.

Remixing for Coldharbour Recordings
As a result of the success of 'Spacewalk' and 'Hello Love', world-famous DJ Markus Schulz approached Phynn in 2010 to do remixes for Coldharbour Recordings. Phynn's remixes for Coldharbour Recordings became a huge success. Phynn composed and produced remixes for 'Mike Foyle pres. Statica - Deadly Nightshade', 'Rex Mundi - Opera of Northern Ocean', 'Hammer & Bennet - Language' and 'Markus Schulz - Rain'. As a result of the success of these high-profile remixes, Phynn became in high demand by record labels such as Perfecto Records, Black Hole Recordings and Euphonic Records for remixes.

Lunary Records 
In mid-2013, Phynn launched his own record label Lunary Records, headquartered in the United States of America. Lunary Records focuses mainly on Techno music, but also releases other electronic music genres.

Departure from Trance
In June 2014, Phynn announced on his Facebook page that he will no longer be making Trance music, and that he is taking a new musical direction and will focus on Techno going forward.

Discography

Albums
 2008 Metamorphosis

Singles
 2004 Escape
 2004 Exotica / High Tide
 2005 Lucid / Solitude
 2005 Close Encounter
 2005 Tempest
 2006 Treasure Island
 2006 Oslo Summerparade Theme
 2007 C U Smile
 2007 This Is The Time
 2008 Starfire At Night
 2008 Try Again
 2009 Spacewalk
 2010 The Halo Effect
 2010 Hello Love
 2010 Supernova
 2012 In Your Heart / Torque
 2014 Galaxy
 2014 Quantum

Remixes
 2003 Sound De-Zign – Happiness
 2003 Simon Patterson - Andantino (with Edwin K.)
 2003 Lique - Angel
 2003 Ernesto vs. Bastian - Who's The Starter
 2004 Varian - Passion
 2004 Ernesto vs. Bastian - Stop 9.5
 2004 Lightscape - Inner Warmth
 2004 UKNY Connection - Amsterdam
 2004 Fictivision - Out Of Orbit
 2004 4 Rising Stars - Feelin' Me
 2005 Tiësto - Adagio For Strings
 2006 Javier & Finjemaen - Sweet Talk
 2006 DJ Ruby - Modulation Error
 2006 Edwin K - Encante
 2007 Jes Brieden - Ghost
 2008 Andy Duguid ft. Leah - Don't Belong
 2009 Lee Canning - The Universe
 2009 Claudia Cazacu - Earproof
 2010 Mike Foyle - Deadly Nightshade
 2010 Richard Durand - Dryland
 2010 Rex Mundi - Opera of Northern Ocean
 2010 Adiva - Desired Love
 2010 Hammer & Bennett - Language
 2010 Markus Schulz - Rain
 2010 Hans Zimmer - Time
 2011 Space Rockerz - Jet Packin'
 2011 Ronski Speed & Lifted Emotion - Voom
 2012 Wellenrausch - Million Miles To Run
 2012 Robert Vadney - Pop Star

References

External links
 Official Artist Website
 TranceSound.net November 2008 interview

1984 births
Living people
Club DJs
Dutch DJs
Dutch trance musicians
People from Nieuwegein
Remixers
Electronic dance music DJs